The straw hat is an oil painting by Nikolaos Lytras created in 1925, and is considered one of the most daring and impressive works of early Greek Modernism. It is exhibited at the National Gallery of Greece.

Theme 
The theme depicts a young girl with a straw hat in a whitened courtyard in an island landscape during a hot summer day.

Analysis 
It is characteristic of the work of Lystras, who was one of the most notable figures of the Art Group founded in 1917 influenced by expressionism. The artist uses strong and vivid colors, cold and blue-gray cold on the bottom, orange-yellow warm colors at the top. This painting is dominated by shades of yellow with a complementary purple that paints the figure with wide free strokes of thick paint and gestural brushwork, emphasizing the material nature of the color.

See also 
 National Gallery (Athens)

References 

Greek art
1925 paintings
Modernist works
Paintings in Greece